Hofsee (Federow) is a lake in the Mecklenburgische Seenplatte district in Mecklenburg-Vorpommern, Germany. At an elevation of 65 m, its surface area is 0.139 km².

Lakes of Mecklenburg-Western Pomerania